Sing Buri is a town (thesaban mueang) in Thailand, capital of the Sing Buri Province. It lies 141 km north of Bangkok. The town covers the whole tambon Bang Phutsa and parts of Bang Man, Muang Mu, Ton Pho, and Bang Krabue, all within Mueang Sing Buri District. As of 2006, it had a population of 19,470.

External links

Website of town (Thai)
Website of province (Thai)

Populated places in Sing Buri province
Populated places on the Chao Phraya River